The Cowie Formation is a mid-Silurian period geological formation located on the Highland Boundary Fault between the fishing village of Cowie and Ruthery Head, in Aberdeenshire, Scotland. This formation preserves fossils, including a 420 million-year-old millipede (Cowiedesmus) that was discovered by Mike Newman in 2001.

Geological History

The sandstones and mudstones that form the outcrops along the coast were mostly laid down by braided rivers crossing a semi-arid, low-relief landscape.

Rare fossils contained in one particular layer near Cowie Harbour indicate that these rocks are over 428 million years old and belong to the mid-Silurian period. One particularly exciting find was made here in 2003 when a fragment of a fossil millipede was identified as the earliest known air-breathing animal in the world. It is celebrated in a display board on the seafront at Cowie.

One unusual feature of these layered sedimentary rocks is that they are tilted to the southeast at a very steep angle and therefore are seen edge on in the outcrops on the foreshore and is formally known as the Strathmore Syncline. When these layers are followed southeast for several kilometers, the degree of tilting towards the southeast is seen to decrease until the layers are almost horizontal and then steepen again as they begin to tilt towards the northwest, thus defining a broad U-shaped fold in the rock strata known as a syncline.

The tilting of the strata took place when two regions of the Earth's lithosphere (the relatively rigid outer layer of the planet, which includes the crust and uppermost Mantle) were subjected to strong compressive forces over a long period. This took place between about 500 and 400 million years ago when two plates were in collision, bringing together the ancient continents of Avalonia and Laurentia. One consequence of this collision was the buckling of the thick deposits of sedimentary rocks that had, at that time, recently accumulated in this northern part of the Midland Valley.

See also

 List of fossiliferous stratigraphic units in Scotland

References

 

Geologic formations of Scotland
Silurian System of Europe
Silurian Scotland
Silurian southern paleotropical deposits
Devonian southern paleotropical deposits